An ion trap is a combination of electric and/or magnetic fields used to capture charged particles — known as ions — often in a system isolated from an external environment. Atomic and molecular ion traps have a number of applications in physics and chemistry such as precision mass spectrometry, improved atomic frequency standards, and quantum computing. In comparison to neutral atom traps, ion traps have deeper trapping potentials (up to several electronvolts) that do not depend on the internal electronic structure of a trapped ion. This makes ion traps more suitable for the study of light interactions with single atomic systems. The two most popular types of ion traps are the Penning trap, which forms a potential via a combination of static electric and magnetic fields, and the Paul trap which forms a potential via a combination of static and oscillating electric fields.

Penning traps can be used for precise magnetic measurements in spectroscopy. Studies of quantum state manipulation most often use the Paul trap. This may lead to a trapped ion quantum computer and has already been used to create the world's most accurate atomic clocks. Electron guns (a device emitting high-speed electrons, used in CRTs) can use an ion trap to prevent degradation of the cathode by positive ions.

Theory

A charged particle, such as an ion, feels a force from an electric field. As a consequence of Earnshaw's theorem, it is not possible to confine an ion in an electrostatic field. However, physicists have various ways of working around this theorem by using combinations of static magnetic and electric fields (as in a Penning trap) or by oscillating electric fields (Paul trap). In the case of the latter, a common analysis begins by observing how an ion of charge  and mass  behaves in an a.c. electric field .

 .

Assuming that the ion has zero initial velocity, two successive integrations give the velocity and displacement as

 ,

 ,

where  is a constant of integration. Thus, the ion oscillates with angular frequency  and amplitude proportional to the electric field strength. A trapping potential can be realized by spatially varying the strength of the a.c. electric field.

Linear Paul Trap

The linear Paul trap uses an oscillating quadrupole field to trap ions radially and a static potential to confine ions axially. The quadrupole field is realized by four parallel electrodes laying in the -axis positioned at the corners of a square in the -plane. Electrodes diagonally opposite each other are connected and an a.c. voltage  is applied. Along the -axis, an analysis of the radial symmetry yields a potential

 .

Assuming the length of the electrodes  is much greater than their separation , it can be shown that

 .

Since the electric field is given by the gradient of the potential, we get that

 .

Defining , the equations of motion in the -plane are a simplified form of the Mathieu equation,

 .

Penning Trap

A standard configuration for a Penning trap consists of a ring electrode and two end caps. A static voltage differential between the ring and end caps confines ions along the axial direction (between end caps). However, as expected from Earnshaw's theorem, the static electric potential is not sufficient to trap an ion in all three dimensions. To provide the radial confinement, a strong axial magnetic field is applied.

For a uniform electric field , the force  accelerates a positively charged ion along the -axis. For a uniform magnetic field , the Lorentz force causes the ion to move in circular motion with cyclotron frequency

 .

 ,
 ,
 .

The resulting motion is a combination of oscillatory motion around the -axis with frequency  and a drift velocity in the -direction. The drift velocity is perpendicular to the direction of the electric field.

For the radial electric field produced by the electrodes in a Penning trap, the drift velocity will precess around the axial direction with some frequency , called the magnetron frequency. An ion will also have a third characteristic frequency  between the two end cap electrodes.

Ion trap mass spectrometers

An ion trap mass spectrometer may incorporate a Penning trap (Fourier-transform ion cyclotron resonance), Paul trap or the Kingdon trap. The Orbitrap, introduced in 2005, is based on the Kingdon trap. Other types of mass spectrometers may also use a linear quadrupole ion trap as a selective mass filter.

Penning ion trap
 
A Penning trap stores charged particles using a strong homogeneous axial magnetic field to confine particles radially and a quadrupole electric field to confine the particles axially. Penning traps are well suited for measurements of the properties of ions and stable charged subatomic particles. Precision studies of the electron magnetic moment by Dehmelt and others are an important topic in modern physics.

Penning traps can be used in quantum computation and quantum information processing and are used at CERN to store antimatter. Penning traps form the basis of Fourier-transform ion cyclotron resonance mass spectrometry for determining the mass-to-charge ratio of ions.

The Penning Trap was invented by Frans Michel Penning and Hans Georg Dehmelt, who built the first trap in the 1950s.

Paul ion trap

A Paul trap is a type of quadrupole ion trap that uses static direct current (DC) and radio frequency (RF) oscillating electric fields to trap ions. Paul traps are commonly used as components of a mass spectrometer. The invention of the 3D quadrupole ion trap itself is attributed to Wolfgang Paul who shared the Nobel Prize in Physics in 1989 for this work. The trap consists of two hyperbolic metal electrodes with their foci facing each other and a hyperbolic ring electrode halfway between the other two electrodes. Ions are trapped in the space between these three electrodes by the oscillating and static electric fields.

Kingdon trap and orbitrap

A Kingdon trap consists of a thin central wire, an outer cylindrical electrode and isolated end cap electrodes at both ends. A static applied voltage results in a radial logarithmic potential between the electrodes. In a Kingdon trap there is no potential minimum to store the ions; however, they are stored with a finite angular momentum about the central wire and the applied electric field in the device allows for the stability of the ion trajectories. In 1981, Knight introduced a modified outer electrode that included an axial quadrupole term that confines the ions on the trap axis. The dynamic Kingdon trap has an additional AC voltage that uses strong defocusing to permanently store charged particles. The dynamic Kingdon trap does not require the trapped ions to have angular momentum with respect to the filament.  An Orbitrap is a modified Kingdon trap that is used for mass spectrometry. Though the idea has been suggested and computer simulations performed neither the Kingdon nor the Knight configurations were reported to produce mass spectra, as the simulations indicated mass resolving power would be problematic.

Trapped ion quantum computer

Some experimental work towards developing quantum computers use trapped ions. Units of quantum information called qubits are stored in stable electronic states of each ion, and quantum information can be processed and transferred through the collective quantized motion of the ions, interacting by the Coulomb force.  Lasers are applied to induce coupling between the qubit states (for single qubit operations) or between the internal qubit states and external motional states (for entanglement between qubits).

Cathode ray tubes

Ion traps were used in television receivers prior to the introduction of aluminized CRT faces around 1958, to protect the phosphor screen from ions. The ion trap must be delicately adjusted for maximum brightness.

See also 
Laser cooling
Mass spectrometry
Quantum jump

References

External links 
 VIAS Science Cartoons A cranky view of an ion trap...
 Paul trap

Mass spectrometry
Ions